George Washington Davis VI (born 20 August 1938) was a rear admiral in the United States Navy. He was the Naval Inspector General from 1990 to 1992. Davis is a 1960 graduate of the United States Naval Academy.

References

1938 births
Living people
United States Naval Academy alumni
United States Navy rear admirals
United States Navy Inspectors General